Papelón con limón (Regional Spanish for: Panela with lemon) is a refreshing Venezuelan beverage made with rapadura (raw hardened sugar cane juice), water and lemon or lime juice.

It is usually served during the hottest hours of the day, and commonly offered with traditional Venezuelan food, such as arepas, cachapas or hervidos (rich chicken or beef stew).

See also

 Aguapanela, a similar drink from Colombia
 List of lemonade topics

References

Venezuelan drinks
Lemonade